On the Verge of a Fever is a 2004 Canadian drama film, directed by John L'Ecuyer. An adaptation of Dany Laferrière's novel Dining with the Dictator (Le Goût des jeunes filles), the film is set in Haiti over the weekend in 1971 when François Duvalier died and was succeeded as president of Haiti by his son Jean-Claude Duvalier. It centres on Fanfan (Lansana Kourouma), a teenage boy who is hiding from the Tonton Macoute after being drawn into trouble by his friend Gégé (Urly Darly), and who loses his virginity to Miki (Koumba Ball), the young woman sheltering him at her home. Fanfan is a character who frequently recurs in Laferrière's work, including the concurrent film How to Conquer America in One Night (Comment conquérir l'Amérique en une nuit), which was Laferrière's own directorial debut.

The film's cast also includes Mireille Metellus, Daphnée Desravines, Néhémie Dumay, Maïta Lavoie and Maka Kotto, as well as cameo appearances by Dan Bigras, Luck Mervil and Laferrière himself in a brief introductory narration.

Although set in Haiti, the film was shot primarily in Guadeloupe due to the political instability of Haiti at the time.

The film premiered at the 2004 Toronto International Film Festival.

It was a Black Reel Award nominee for Outstanding Independent Film at the Black Reel Awards of 2006.

References

External links

2004 films
2004 drama films
Canadian coming-of-age drama films
Black Canadian films
Films set in Haiti
Films shot in Guadeloupe
Films based on Canadian novels
Films directed by John L'Ecuyer
French-language Canadian films
2000s Canadian films